is a railway station in Yatsushiro, Kumamoto Prefecture, Japan, operated by Kyushu Railway Company (JR Kyushu).

Layout
A special elevated spur runs from north of the station to the Shinkansen platform. From 2004 to 2011, Relay Tsubame limited express trains from Hakata on the Kagoshima Line provided the link to the Shinkansen line, and Shin-Yatsushiro was designed to facilitate an easy and fast connection between the Relay Tsubame train and the Tsubame shinkansen train on the same platform.

The spur line is not used by regular services, but was utilized in 2014 for reliability trials of the Gauge Change Train between Kumamoto and Kagoshima-Chuo Station, including gauge changing on the spur line. The trials were originally planned to run for three years starting in April 2014, but were suspended that December after defects were found in the train bogies.

History
The station opened on 13 March 2004, to coincide with the opening of a section of the Kyushu Shinkansen high speed railway line. The Kyushu Shinkansen Tsubame was operational from Shin-Yatushiro to Kagoshima-Chuo station in Kagoshima until 2011, when the Shinkansen was extended north to Hakata station in Fukuoka and joined with the Sanyo Shinkansen line.

On 8 November 2021, a man was arrested at the station after an attempted arson on board a Sakura service.

See also
List of railway stations in Japan

References

External links

Station Information (JR Kyushu) 

Railway stations in Japan opened in 2004
Railway stations in Kumamoto Prefecture
Rail transport articles in need of updating